AirMagnet was a Wi-Fi wireless network assurance  company based in Sunnyvale, California. The firm was founded in 2001 by Dean T. Au, Chia-Chee Kuan and Miles Wu and shipped its first WLAN analyzer product in 2002.  In August 2006, the company shipped the Vo-Fi Analyzer, the first voice-over-Wi-Fi analyzer that could be used on encrypted VoWLAN networks.  It was backed by venture capital firms such as Intel Capital, Acer Technology Ventures and VenGlobal.

The company manufactured and sold a suite of wireless site survey tools, laptop analyzers, spectrum analyzers, handheld analyzers, network management and troubleshooting solutions (including wireless access point management via LWAPP), as well as wireless intrusion detection systems (WIDS) and wireless intrusion prevention systems (WIPS) products and VoWLAN instruments.

In August 2009, Fluke Networks acquired AirMagnet. which later became part of NetScout.

On September 14, 2018 NetScout divests Handheld network testing (HNT) tools business to a private equity firm StoneCalibre. This transaction includes AirMagnet Mobile solutions. AirMagnet Enterprise product line of WIPS  monitoring solutions was retained NetScout. 

August 14, 2019 StoneCalibre launched acquired HNT products as a new company NetAlly.

References

External links
 Fluke Networks Completes Acquisition of AirMagnet
 Fluke Networks wireless products
 "AirMagnet Rolls Out Voice-Over-Wi-Fi Analysis Tool" May 2006 article in Information Week Magazine
 "Airmagnet Boosts WLAN Security, Monitoring Features" February 2006 article in ComputerWorld Magazine
 "Wireless Propagator: Seeing the Unseen" March 2006 article in Network Computing Magazine

Electronics companies of the United States
Companies based in Sunnyvale, California